Lóránt Méhes (born 5 January 1951, Szabadszállás) is a Hungarian visual artist and painter. He has been involved with non-conformist visual art and alternative culture since the early '70s.

Career 
"Lóránt Zuzu Méhes was born in 1951 in the small town of Szabadszállás, which can be found in Bács-Kiskun County, Hungary, 80 kilometres south of Budapest by rail. He grew up in the nearby town of Kiskunfélegyháza, where his elementary school teacher encouraged him to take up art. In his early teens he moved to Budapest to enroll at the Török Pál Technical College for Fine and Applied Arts, where he was to study for the next five years. His young teacher, Ákos Birkás, remembers that "Zuzu" was a magnetic personality, free-spirited, and headstrong, "just like Jim Morrison". Whilst at college, Zuzu made a number of friends who were to play an important role in his life, including the highly-regarded film director Gábor Bódy. It was through Bódy that he was introduced to the avant-garde art scene of Budapest in the late 60s. He befriended the painter and graphic artist László Méhes in 1971, and painted two black and white photorealist works inspired by an art album that introduced American Photorealism. Following this he created a number of portraits, including a painting of his own identity card.

Before attending the Hungarian Academy of Fine Arts he was conscripted to the army, where he met his wife-to-be Marietta. When released, he studied art restoration at the Academy, and produced photorealist pictures for his exams. After two years he took a year off, and when he returned he switched to study graphic art. His years studying graphic art are best characterized by a plan for a billboard advertisement entitled Energiatakarékossági plakátterv [Billboard Advertisement for Saving Energy]. The work depicts the element inside a light bulb as a burning 100 forint note. Zuzu also participated in the Rózsa presszó [Rose Presso] action art group, and in 1976 he created Fáklya [Torch], along with the artist András Koncz. Both men dipped their hands in petrol, and set fire to them, posing as models for each other's camera.

 The "Zuzu-Vetõ Era" 
Zuzu befriended János Vetõ in the early 1970s. Vetõ was an experimental artist, photographer, poet, and lyricist, and worked for a number of well-known contemporary Hungarian bands. In 1980, on New Year's Eve, the two began drawing together on A4 paper with a felt tip pen. This led to a series of now-lost drawings entitled Más [Different]. They performed their first piece of collaborative action art in 1981, which was videoed by their friend Szabolcs Szilágyi. The search is still underway for a copy of that video. However, the work Neutrin-ócska [roughly "Neutrin-orrible"], which consists of a number of photos that have been painted on, also documents this work. The two artists mime an event before a pre-produced background with masks and boxes on their heads. They stuck a painted circle with "corners" cut out of paper on the background. This was to become a recurring motif in later works. Zuzu and Vetõ often based their concepts on witticisms, associations, and conversations, but the works themselves were realized without communication or restriction. "I drew a line, János finished it", as Zuzu said, and of course, the opposite was also true. They mixed Socialist symbols with those of ancient or religious cultures, used objects to create their own symbols, and used words in an emblematic way (e.g. "red star", "sickle", "hammer", "factory", "tractor", "heart", "skull", "bone", "magnet", "antenna", "rocket", "spaceship", "man", "woman", "school", "pyramid", and "altar"). The pair worked together until 1986, using the names Zuzu-Vetõ, Zuzu-Ska and ZuzuKína at both national and international exhibitions in Austria, Germany, Great Britain, Poland, Finland, Denmark, and Cuba.

 "Mystical" Pictures 
Az isteni szeretet oltára [The Altar of Devotion to God] is a work that was created following a visual phenomenon experienced during a house party in 1984, and expresses the search for God. The wings of the gilded altar consist of twelve colour pencil drawings in golden frames which represent "mandalas". The drawings were created over a period of seven years as works of meditation. We may see "objects of worship" lined up on the altar's shelves, including a "peace pipe"; the work represents a hierarchy of religious conviction which was developed during a period studying Krishna consciousness, Tibetan Buddhism, and the esoteric and mystical doctrines of Catholicism. Other types of mystical imagery include "visions", represented in a realistic, almost plastic way, and "concepts", which have undergone a process of abstraction to form symbols.

 "New" Pictures 
Many of the "new" pictures are self-explanatory, and require no explanation. They often represent fashionable or well-known figures. However, the photographs used for the paintings are "transformed" during the work process; following this, they are given titles, and the frozen images that originate from the restructured painted compositions become "living icons". This does not happen due to the mere omission of particular details or the alteration of the original picture, but due to Zuzu's characteristic way of seeing, and his unique mode of expression. We see self-confident models; there are fashionably-dressed, young, innocent females who are famous actresses; and then there is Zuzu, a well-groomed, young, but romantically poor painter in his socks - he is the great conjurer, a wizard. Both the smooth transitions between the brilliant colours and the perfectly uniform picture surfaces are the result of the artist applying pigment with the smallest of brush-strokes. This disguises all trace of the painting process and the image's photographic past; instead, what we see are reflections of a "mystical" present tense, frozen images that glow softly with timeless brilliance."

Hungarian text: Noemi Forian-Szabo

English text adapted from the Hungarian by: Philip Barker

Exhibitions

Selected solo exhibitions 

 2021 Lóránt Méhes Zuzu 70, Galeria K.A.S., Budapest
 2016  New photos, Galeria Byart, Budapest -  Lóránt Méhes exhibition, Léna & Roselly Gallery, Budapest

2015 Photos From The Seventies, Neon Gallery, Budapest
2014–2015 Constellation (Balázs Fekete, Pál Gerber, Lóránt Méhes), Supermarket Gallery, Budapest
 2014 Lóránt Méhes Zuzu: A retrospective exhibition, Kiskunfélegyháza, Művelődési Ház
 2013 We Are Resurrected (Zuzu-Vető), Neon Gallery, Budapest
2010 Lóránt Méhes Zuzu, Memoart Gallery, Budapest
2009  Lóránt Méhes Zuzu, Mono Gallery, Budapest
2008  Lóránt Méhes Zuzu, Memoart Gallery, Budapest
 2007  Lóránt Méhes Zuzu: A retrospective exhibition, Ernst Museum, Budapest  - Mari és Évike (Zuzu-Vető), Memoart Gallery, Budapest
 2006 Zuzu-Vető, Kisterem Gallery, Budapest
2002: Little Pictures (1982-2002), Blitz Gallery, Budapest
2000: Memorial-Light-Picture, Vizivárosi Gallery, Budapest
1993 Lóránt Méhes exhibition, Fészek Gallery, Budapest
1991 An Altar of Divine Love, Dorottya Gallery, Budapest
1989 Altar In The Black Exhibition Space, Young Artists Club, Budapest - Méhes Lóránt, Vető János, Gasner János, Kiss László, Margitszigeti Víztorony, (Margaret Island Water Tower) Budapest
1988 Tales to Csilla, Liget Gallery, Budapest
 1985 Post-traditionelle Kunst, Galeria Mana, Vienna
 1984 - Flags, obo, obosutras, Stúdió Gallery, Budapest
 1983 New flags, New Winds, Young Artists Club, Budapest - Ifjúsági Ház (Youth House), Székesfehérvár
 1982 Cellar Sculpture Garden, Vajda Lajos Studio, Szentendre - It's beautiful today, Rabinext Gallery, Budapest
 1981 Tibet Autumn Camp, (Zuzu-Vető), Young Artists Club, Budapest - New Tractor Operating Agency, Bercsényi Club, Budapest - Bam-Bam, Just A Little Louder... Bercsényi Club, Budapest

Selected group exhibitions 

 2022 Synthesis 2022, Széphárom Közösségi Tér, Budapest
 2021 Standby exhibition, Budapest - Synthesis 2021, Széphárom Közösségi Tér, Budapest

 2019 Epoch Treasures, Danube Museum, Esztergom
 2015 More Light! Light Environments, New Budapest Gallery, Budapest
 2014 Hungarian Hippie, kArton Gallery, Budapest
 2011 East of Eden - Photorealism, Ludwig Museum, Budapest - Group Exhibition, G13 Gallery, Budapest
 2004 Freshly Painted, Hall of Art, Budapest 
 2003 Cream II., MEO Contemporary Art Collection, Budapest
 2001 Cream I., MEO Contemporary Art Collection, Budapest
 1998 Rose Presso, Ernst Museum, Budapest
 1997 Oil/Canvas, Hall of Art, Budapest 
 1995 Circle and Light, Hungarian Culture Institute, New Delhi
 1991 Contemporary Art, Hungarian National Gallery, Budapest
 1989 Contemporary Hungarian Art, National Gallery, Prague and House of Arts, Bratislava
 1987 Magical Artworks, Budapest Galéria, Budapest
 1986-87 Aspekte Ungarischer Malerei der Gegenwart, Erholungshaus der Bayer AG, Leverkusen / Stadhalle Hagen / Stadthaus Galerie, Münster
1986 In Quotes, Csók István Képtár, Székesfehérvár 
 1985 101 objects, Óbuda Gallery, Budapest  - Unkarin maalaustaidetta 1945-1985, Kaupungin     talon Ala-Aula, Helsinki - Hungarian Arts in Glasgow – Eighteen Artists, Glasgow Art Center, Glasgow - Drei Generationen Ungarischer Künstler, Neue Galerie am Landesmuseum, Graz - Caption, Kunsthalle, Budapest - XI. Prezentacja Malarzy Krajów Socjalistycznych, Szczecin
 1984 Newly painted, Ernst Museum, Budapest - Plánum ’84 Art Festival, Almássy Hall, Budapest - Gud & Gramatik, Charlottenborg, Kobenhaven - Grenzzeichen ’84, Landesgalerie im Schloss Esterházy, Eisenstadt
 1983 "Álomi szép képek",  Óbuda Gallery, Budapest
 1982 It's beautiful today, Rabinec Atelier, Budapest - Egoland Art, Fészek Gallery, Budapest

References

External links 
Lóránt Méhes Zuzu artist

Living people
1951 births
People from Szabadszállás
20th-century Hungarian painters
21st-century Hungarian painters
21st-century male artists
Hungarian male painters
20th-century Hungarian male artists